Mutters is a municipality in the Innsbruck-Land district in the Austrian state of Tyrol. The village was first mentioned in 1100 but settlement already began app. 3000 years ago. Mutters received connection with Innsbruck thanks to the Stubaitalbahn in 1904.

The Muttereralmbahn is a cable car system originating from Mutters.

Population

References

External links

Cities and towns in Innsbruck-Land District